Douglas Henderson (6 March 1913 – 2002) was an English professional footballer who played as a half-back or right-back for Southampton in the 1930s.

Football career
Henderson was born in Southampton and was educated at St Denys School. He played youth football for Park Avenue and was spotted playing in a match on Southampton Common by Southampton's trainer, Bert Shelley.

He joined Southampton as an amateur in September 1934, and signed professional papers shortly afterwards, making his first-team debut at right-back away to Bury on 1 January 1936. With Bill Adams well-established at right-back, Henderson was never a regular selection, although he did play the last six matches of the 1935–36 season as a  half-back as cover for the ageing Arthur Bradford and Stan Woodhouse.

Henderson only made one appearance in the following season, on the final day, but in February 1938 managed a run of nine games taking over from Charlie Sillett at right-back. After a handful of appearances the following year, he was given a free transfer to Bristol City in June 1939, but the outbreak of the Second World War brought his career to a close.

Later career
Following the outbreak of war, Henderson returned to Southampton to become a policeman. He remained in the police force until his retirement.

References

1913 births
2002 deaths
Footballers from Southampton
English footballers
Association football defenders
Association football midfielders
Southampton F.C. players
Bristol City F.C. players